Craig Carlson is an American soap opera (Daytime television) writer.

Positions held
All My Children
Breakdown Writer (October 1997 - April 2002)

Another World
Co-Head Writer (August 1995 - May 1996; January 1997 - April 1997)
Breakdown Writer (1993 - August 1995; May 1996 - January 1997; April 1997 - October 1997)

Capitol
Script Writer (1984)

Guiding Light
Breakdown Writer (1995)

Loving
Script Writer (1992-1993)

One Life to Live
Co-Head Writer (1990-1991)
Breakdown Writer (1985-1990)
Script Writer (1982-1985)

Awards and nominations
Daytime Emmy Awards

WINS
(1987; Best Writing; One Life to Live) 
(1998; Best Writing; All My Children)

NOMINATIONS 
(1983, 1990 & 1992; Best Writing; One Life to Live)
(1994 & 1996; Best Writing; Another World) 
(1999, 2001, 2002 & 2003; Best Writing; All My Children)

Writers Guild of America Award

WINS
(1994 season; Loving)
(1999, 2001 & 2002 seasons; All My Children)

NOMINATIONS 
(1984 season; Capitol)
(1987 season; One Life to Live) 
(1994, 1995 & 1998 seasons; Another World)
(1996 season; Guiding Light)
(2000 season; All My Children)

Head Writing Tenure

External links
IMDB
FilmInAmerica: Shredder

Living people
American soap opera writers
American male television writers
Daytime Emmy Award winners
Writers Guild of America Award winners
Year of birth missing (living people)